Ann-Charlotte Hammar Johnsson, born in 1966, is a Swedish politician of the Moderate Party. She has been a member of the Riksdag since 2006, replacing Cristina Husmark Pehrsson due to Husmark Pehrsson's service as the Minister for Social Insurance.

References
Ann-Charlotte Hammar Johnsson at the Riksdag website

1966 births
21st-century Swedish politicians
21st-century Swedish women politicians
Living people
Members of the Riksdag 2006–2010
Members of the Riksdag 2010–2014
Members of the Riksdag 2014–2018
Members of the Riksdag 2018–2022
Members of the Riksdag 2022–2026
Members of the Riksdag from the Moderate Party
Women members of the Riksdag